İpek Soylu and Jil Teichmann were the defending champions, but they chose not to participate.
Viktória Kužmová and Aleksandra Pospelova won the title, defeating Anna Kalinskaya and Anastasia Potapova in the final, 7–5, 6–2.

Seeds

Draw

Finals

Top half

Bottom half

External links 
 Draw

Girls' Doubles
US Open, 2015 Girls' Doubles